Lachapelle may refer to:

Places
 Lachapelle, Lot-et-Garonne
 Lachapelle, Meurthe-et-Moselle
 Lachapelle, Somme
 Lachapelle, Tarn-et-Garonne

People with the surname
 Gérard Lachapelle, Canadian engineer

See also
 Chapelle (disambiguation)